Plaza Intendente Alvear is a public space in Recoleta, Buenos Aires. It is commonly but mistakenly known as Plaza Francia, as the actual Plaza Francia is located at its side.
It faces the Recoleta Cemetery and the cultural center.

History
The plaza became famous in the 1960s for its street fair. Over time, in addition to genuine artisans and craftspeople, the fair has attracted street vendors and merchants of a wide variety of merchandise.

Modern use

At present, the Government of the City of Buenos Aires has reorganized the fair, encouraging the participation of those artisans whose work is original and authentic and discouraging those whose merchandise is of low quality or those who simply sell mass-produced items. The artisans, led by the organization, Interferias, must pass an evaluation process and be registered. Visitors to the fair may find a variety of handicraft items, many of them of high quality:  leather goods, book restoration, sandals and espadrilles, carved mates, ethnic jewelry, incense, essential oils, spices, satchels, candles, indigenous musical instruments, photography, etc.

Gallery

References

Tourist attractions in Buenos Aires
Alvear